The Ötillö (also Ö till Ö, stylised as ÖtillÖ) is a series of endurance swimrun competitions originating in Sweden.

References 

Duathlon competitions
Swimming competitions in Sweden